Into Eternity is a 2010 Danish documentary film directed by Michael Madsen, released in 2010. It follows the construction of the Onkalo waste repository at the Olkiluoto Nuclear Power Plant on the island of Olkiluoto, Finland. Director Michael Madsen questions Onkalo's intended eternal existence, addressing an audience in the remote future.

Into Eternity raises the question of the authorities' responsibility of ensuring compliance with relatively new safety criteria legislation and the principles at the core of nuclear waste management.

When shown on the British More4 digital television channel on 26 April 2011, the name Nuclear Eternity was used. It received a special mention in the Sheffield Green Award at Sheffield Doc/Fest in 2010.

Background
Into Eternity is a documentary about a deep geological repository for nuclear waste. The concept of long-term underground storage for radioactive waste has been explored since the 1950s. The inner part of the Russian doll-like storage canisters is to be composed of copper. Hence in the case of Onkalo it is tightly linked to experiments on copper corrosion in running groundwater flow.

Application for the implementation of spent nuclear fuel repository was submitted by Posiva in 2001. The excavation itself started in 2004. With a total of four operable reactors providing 25% of the country's energy supply, Finland ranks 16th in the world nuclear power reactors country list topped by the United States (104 reactors) and France (58 reactors).

Synopsis

This film explores the question of preparing the site so that it is not disturbed for 100,000 years, even though no structure in human history has stayed standing for such a long period.

Reception
The film received overall positive reviews from Swedish film critics, with an average score of 3.6 of 5 according to Kritiker.se. Praise was given for the suggestive presentation of the daunting task of communicating the dangers of nuclear waste far into the future, as well as the great dangers of handling the by-products of nuclear energy. At the same time, the same presentation was criticized by Dagens Nyheter for "numbing" the viewer by being exaggerated or even over-simplified. Cornell University anthropologist Vincent Ialenti has described differences between Madsen's film's "aesthetics of desolation and bleakness, of forbidding machinery and industrial processes" and his own fieldwork experiences in Olkiluoto repository safety case experts' offices. The film received the Green Screen Documentary Award at the International Documentary Film Festival Amsterdam (IDFA).

References

External links

 "Deep Time Reckoning." (Vincent Ialenti) Cambridge, MA: The MIT Press (2020).
 Page at the Dogwoof film distributor website
 Nuclear Energy Act, 1987
 BBC News - Finland buries its nuclear past, 27/04/2006
 
  Dr. Helen Caldicott interview director of the film]
  Review in Washington City Paper
  Review in The New York Times
"Sebastian Musch: The Atomic Priesthood and Nuclear Waste Management - Religion, Sci-fi Literature and the End of our Civilization

Finnish documentary films
Films shot in Finland
Radioactive waste
2010 films
Documentary films about environmental issues
2010 documentary films
Nuclear technology in Finland
Documentary films about nuclear technology
Danish documentary films
2010s English-language films